The Case Centre, headquartered in Cranfield University, Cranfield, Bedford, United Kingdom, and with its US office at Babson College, Wellesley, Massachusetts, is the independent home of the case method, with more than 500 member organisations worldwide.

The Case Centre is also the world’s largest repository of case studies used in teaching Management subjects and allied disciplines. Its stated aim is to promote the case method by sharing knowledge, skills, and expertise in this area among teachers and students.

History 

The Case Centre, is a not-for-profit organisation and registered charity founded in 1973. It was founded as Case Clearing House of Great Britain and Ireland, as a collaborative initiative of 22 higher educational institutions that wanted a platform to share case materials between management educators. As the initiative grew in Europe, the organization rebranded itself as the European Case Clearing House in 1991, and again rebranded itself to ecch in 2005 to reflect its global presence, and finally rebranded to The Case Centre in 2013 to reflect its preeminent position in case method.

Case Centre Awards & Competitions 

In order to promote the case method, The Case Centre recognises outstanding case writers and teachers worldwide through The Case Centre Awards (known as the European Awards between 1991 and 2010). These prestigious awards, popularly known as the case method community's annual 'Oscars', celebrate worldwide excellence in case writing and teaching.

Journal 
In 2019, The Case Centre launched the Case Focus, a journal for high-quality, peer reviewed teaching cases, focused on the Middle East and Africa region.

References 

Educational organisations based in the United Kingdom
Management education
Business education
Non-profit organisations based in the United Kingdom
Charities based in Bedfordshire
Cranfield University